XHPMAZ-FM is a radio station on 92.1 FM in Mazatlán, Sinaloa, Mexico. It is owned by Multimedios Radio and carries its La Lupe Spanish variety hits format.

History

XHPMAZ was awarded in the IFT-4 radio auction of 2017 and came to air that fall airing its La Caliente grupera format. At 55.5 million pesos, it was the second-most expensive station awarded in the IFT-4 radio station auction; only Cancún's XHPBCQ-FM went for more money.

On June 1, 2020, Multimedios flipped the formats of XHPMAZ and XHLRS-FM in Ciudad Victoria to Spanish adult hits in its La Lupe format.

References

2017 establishments in Mexico
Radio stations established in 2017
Radio stations in Sinaloa
Spanish-language radio stations
Multimedios Radio